Parathyris semivitrea is a moth of the family Erebidae first described by James John Joicey and George Talbot in 1916. It is found in French Guiana and Peru.

References

Phaegopterina
Arctiinae of South America
Moths described in 1916